Nicholas Taylor Apollonio (April 9, 1843 – April 1, 1911) was the president of the Boston Red Stockings/Red Caps of the National League from  through .

In 1874, Apollonio took over the presidency from Charles Porter. He was replaced by Arthur Soden in 1876.

References

Atlanta Braves owners

1911 deaths
1843 births
Baseball executives
Boston Braves (baseball)